Bright: Samurai Soul is a 2021 anime film spin-off of Bright directed by Kyōhei Ishiguro from a script by Michiko Yokote and starring the voices of Yūki Nomura, Daisuke Hirakawa, Shion Wakayama, Miyavi, Maaya Sakamoto, Kenjiro Tsuda, Chafurin, Mamoru Miyano, and Kenichi Suzumura while the English dub consists of Simu Liu, Fred Mancuso, Yuzu Harada, Matt Yang King, Victoria Grace, Keone Young, and Paul Nakauchi. The film was released by Netflix on October 12, 2021.

Plot 

In 1868 at Edo Castle, Izou fights among the soldiers to protect the Shogun Yoshinobu Tokugawa against the New Government Army. The battle is stopped by a single Elf Bright whose magical spell illuminates the area and leaves everyone within the periphery in awe.

A few years pass by and the setting changes to Kyoto, the old regime was replaced by the new one called the Meiji restoration. Izou now works as a guard at an undisclosed brothel. He's asked by his superior to lock up a rowdy elf girl who has someone interested in purchasing. Izou does so and is demanded by the elf girl to set her free, but he refuses and leaves the scene as the girl notices a light blue aura emanating from Izou's body. Heading to the High Courtesan Chihaya's room, Izou delivers her a couple of things, one of which is an English vocabulary book. Thankful for the book, Chihaya notices the scratches on Izou's hand and asks where he got it. Izou downplays it and informs her that a "tomboy" just gave him some trouble. Curious about the tomboy, the two of them visit her down in her cell and even though the elf girl gives them a nasty attitude. Chihaya becomes interested in the elf girl and requests that she become her personal attendant.

Later, back in Chihaya's room, Chihaya feeds her new attendant some food and learns her name is Sonya. Deducing that Sonya is of Russia origin, she reveals that her bird is too. Izou eavesdrops on their conversation for a bit and as he walks away from the room it starts to rain causing the wound over his right eye to become agitated. Meanwhile, two warriors appear in front of the brothel and kill Izou's superior, while Sonya is called over by Chihaya. The two talk and Chihaya reveals to Sonya her moniker Chihaya the Forgetful because she lost her memory ever since the start of the Meiji Restoration. She also reveals after taking out her precious hairpin from her hair that she's an Elf. Taking out a large map, Chihaya shows it to Sonya and tells her of a land populated by Elves somewhere north beyond the seas called Hakodate.

At that time, an army composed mainly of Orcs, Goblins and Dwarves raid the brothel and kill the patrons and servants there. Without wasting a moment, Izou fetches his old katana from the storage area and slaughters the invaders. Elsewhere the supposed leader of the invaders enters the place accompanied by his Orc companion named Raiden. The leader promises Raiden's freedom if he manages to sniff out the Elf they're after and begrudgingly, Raiden tacitly agrees and sniffs around the area. Elsewhere, Chihaya hides Sonya in her closet as the man interested in purchasing Sonya earlier barges into Chihaya's room, so they can escape together.

Meanwhile, Izou finishes off three of the invaders, while thinking of Chihaya, he catches sight of the leader and then is attacked by Raiden. The two skirmish until a barrage of flaming arrows rain down upon them. Chihaya, leaves the man in the dust to return to Sonya who passes out due to smoke inhalation from the burning fire around the brothel is then confronted by the invader leader and his cohorts.

Awakening from her unconscious state, Sonya sees a dark aura coming from the leader. Sonya then bites the leader's hand and is knocked to the side revealing that she's an elf in the process. The leader then orders one of his men to capture her, but Chihaya tries to stop them only to be also knocked aside and lose her precious hairpin. Upon touching it, she remembers her past and uses her hairpin to cast a spell that cuts off the leader's left hand. In a fit of rage, the leader stabs Chihaya in the heart and Sonya rushes to her aid. In Chihaya's last moments, she requests that Sonya return her hairpin to Hakodate and casts the same spell that illuminated the Edo Castle those few years ago. Shocked by the illustrious light, Raiden and Izou stop their fighting as Raiden's boss orders him to fetch the Elf girl. Following his leader's orders, Raiden finds Sonya grasping the dead body of Chihaya surrounded by a barrier of light. Astounded by the sight of what the light barrier cast around the two Elves, it dissipates once Sonya passes out and then Izou arrives and attacks Raiden from behind. Izou then picks up the unconscious Sonya and learns her name from Raiden who also saves them from a falling piece of debris. Following Raiden's suggestion, the two escape together with Sonya.

The following day, next to a forest, Raiden is bound to a tree, while Izou makes a makeshift grave for the deceased Chihaya. Izou details to Sonya that Chihaya will be sent to Heaven by doing this, but Sonya claims that she would have wanted to go to the land of Elves Hakodate. Sonya then shows the two Chihaya's hairpin and offers to hire Izou with it. Raiden also offers his services to Sonya noting his former employer captures Elf girls left and right and will continue to hunt her. To prove his resolve and that he won't betray them, Raiden breaks free from his restraints and uses a rock to break off his right fang as a symbol of his vow. Observing the light aura coming from Raiden, Sonya accepts his offer. A Daurian Redstart then flies by them and Raiden takes it as a symbol of good fortune and to add to it, he also knocks two rocks together give their fortune a good luck spark. Raiden then introduces himself and asks for Izou's name, but he refuses to give it, so Sonya answers for him.

At a manor in Yokohama, a military figure receives is informed by a messenger Goblin of the events that occurred back at the brothel. He orders that the Elf girl be captured at any cost. That afternoon at Fuchuu-Shuku, Tokaido, the group finds an inn that'll allow them to stay at and later that evening. Raiden and Izou have a heart to heart about a little bit of Raiden's past and how he seeks a life different from the typical Orcs in Japan. When Raiden asks why Izou was a bodyguard in the brothel, Izou claims that he simply failed to die in the past and is now on borrowed time.

The next day, the group travel onwards and after a brief fit of mistrust between Izou and Raiden, they're ambushed by the brothel invader leader and his cohorts. Amid the skirmish, Izou's right shoulder is sliced, making Izou recall how he lost his right eye by the betrayal of his former superior named Kōketsu. This causes Izou to go berserk and have him slay the ambushers as Sonya notices that his aura has now turned black. Shot and wounded from behind, Raiden was about to be impaled by a spear, but is saved by his former boss. The man approaches Raiden and asks if he's lost his mind, but Raiden begs him to be released. His former boss, allows it only under the condition that he hand Sonya over, and Raiden refuses and the battle continues until they flee the scene. Eventually, the group is chased to a cliff with a fast current river down below. After being shot at they all fall off the cliff and both Raiden and Izou fall into the water, while Sonya lands on a rock.

In a cave, Raiden and Izou are rescued by an old centaur named Tsukuyomi who lives in the cave. Awakening from their unconscious state, they realize that Sonya is missing and then Tsukuyomi appears before them and returns their weapons to them. He then introduces himself as Tsukuyomi. Raiden informs Izou of what he knows of Tsukuyomi, a hermit who is called a sage, although Tsukuyomi doesn't consider himself as such. Asked about Sonya, he claims he doesn't know where she is as they were the only ones he found by his place. Immediately, Izou acts rashly, but is stopped by Raiden, and Tsukuyomi then leads the two up a small set of stairs.

Meanwhile in the military figure's manor, its owner asks one of his guests if they've heard of the name Whole Creation, its relation is to the "Dark Lord". One of his guest answers no he has not. So the man gives his guest an explanation about the Dark Lord and his connection to Magic Wands and reveals that a wand ended the bloodless coup that occurred years ago.

Back in the cave, Tsukuyomi reads an excerpt about Wands from a book and it mentions Brights as those who can harness their power. It's also said that a majority of Brights are in fact Elves. Raiden then deduces that his former boss had him hunt Elves just to find Brights. Tsukuyomi then mentions the two factions who are after the wands, the Shield of Light and the Inferni. Of the Inferni, the military figure offers Ōkubo a deal to join the Inferni if he finds a Wand for him, however, Ōkubo's response is never given, but he mentions how hard to read the man was. The man then heads to the room Sonya was in and demands to know if the beam of light from the brothel was her or not.

Outside of his cave, Tsukuyomi directs Izou and Raiden east of Fuji to Yokohama where a gathering of Elves are located at. He also informs them that Sonya is still alive as the Stars foretold that she is.

Eventually, the two make it to Odawara, Tokaido, and help a young boy named Kotaro who fell and hurt himself. This leads some of the local residents to suspect the two are the kidnappers who are stealing elves from the village. The boy's mother vouches for them and informs them of the village's problem with its Elves going missing. One of which was found dead with its legs severed off.

The next day, the two make it to Yokohama. There, Izou sees someone he may know and recalls once again the memory of how he lost his eye. Noting Izou's uneasiness, they go their separate ways and Izou ends up at a temple where he finds a woman that resembles Chihaya. In reality, the woman is her twin sister.

Meanwhile, Raiden continues his search for an Elf, but instead finds a Goblin linen salesman that has Sonya's old clothing. The salesman details that he got them from an estate in Yamanoe. At the Temple, Izou and Chihaya's twin sister talk, and she reveals that Chihaya's hairpin is actually a wand. Raiden then arrives and informs them that he's found a clue of Sonya's location. Chihaya's twin sister then reveals that Sonya must be in the hands of the Inferni and that she's part of the Shield of Light.

As they head off to the location of the Inferni estate, Chihaya's twin sister elaborates on her and her sister's back story of trying to acquire the wand. Inside of the estate, the Inferni man tricks Sonya into drinking drugged tea, upon learning that Izou and Raiden are still alive. Hence, he takes Sonya in his carriage, which is soon stopped by Izou's group and Izou recognizes the Inferni man as his former master Kōketsu. Both Chihaya's twin sister and Raiden try to attack Kōketsu, but they're deftly deal with by Kōketsu who makes an escape after this as Izou is too shocked to make a move against his former master. Members of the Shield of Light arrive and reveal Chihaya's twin sister's name is Anna and one of them named Nakazo suggests they regroup at their base. The group takes a carriage to a SoL base located at the port of the city where the Inferni boat is thought to be at and it'll take Sonya to their homeland.

Riding on the SoL boat, Izou and Raiden manage to board the Inferni boat and deal with most of the Inferni. Soon, Tōmoku, Raiden's old master now with an octopus hand to replace his missing left, attacks Raiden. In retaliation, Izou slices off one of Tōmoku's tentacles and Raiden slices off his left arm. As Raiden deals with Tōmoku he gets his right leg blown off, as Izou heads into the boat in search of Sonya. With Izou gone, Raiden finishes off Tōmoku, but with the last of his strength, Tōmoku kills Raiden by shooting him directly in the face. Dealing with a Goblin and Orc Inferni, Izou finds Sonya only to be ambushed by his former master out on the deck. Kōketsu offers him to join him again, but Izou refuses and is sequentially killed by him. Distraught, Sonya approaches Izou's corpse and finds the wand on him, and uses it to heal and revive Izou. Anna and Nakazo board the Inferni ship and Anna comes to realize that Sonya is actually a Bright. Kōketsu in an awe-stricken stupor demands that Sonya hand over the wand. Sonya refuses. After mistaking Anna for her twin sister Chihaya, Sonya uses the wand to vaporize Kōketsu.

A few days later, Izo and Raiden now with a new leg see Sonya off as she goes with Anna the SoL. Revealing that he has the wand on his person, Izou tosses it into the ocean and claims that humans will take care of their own problems their own way. Raiden agrees as that's the same way Orcs do it.

Cast

Production 
Netflix first announced the project as part of their Geeked Week in June 2021. Kyōhei Ishiguro was announced as the film's director from a script by Michiko Yokote and with character designs by Atsushi Yamagata. Arect would serve as the animation studio. In September 2021, the cast of the film was revealed to star Yūki Nomura (in his voice acting debut), Daisuke Hirakawa, and Shion Wakayama; and shortly afterward, Simu Liu, Fred Mancuso, and Yuzu Harada were announced to be voicing the English dub.  Miyavi will also star in the film, making his voice actor debut.  The film is animated using 3D computer graphics with art in the style of Japanese woodblock prints.

Reception

References

External links 
 
 
 
 

2020s fantasy action films
2021 anime films
Alternate history anime
Japanese animated feature films
Anime action films
Bright (franchise)
Film spin-offs
Films set in the Meiji period
High fantasy anime and manga
Japanese animated fantasy films
Japanese fantasy action films
Japanese-language Netflix original films
Netflix original anime